In the mathematical theory of Banach spaces, the closed range theorem gives necessary and sufficient conditions for a closed densely defined operator to have closed range.

History 

The theorem was proved by Stefan Banach in his 1932 Théorie des opérations linéaires.

Statement

The theorem asserts that the following conditions are equivalent:

 
 

Corollaries

Several corollaries are immediate from the theorem.  For instance, a densely defined closed operator  as above  has  if and only if the transpose  has a continuous inverse.  Similarly,  if and only if  has a continuous inverse.

References

  
 .

Banach spaces
Theorems in functional analysis